Thomas Peace Yews (28 February 1902 – August 1966) was an English footballer, playing as a winger.

Yews was born in Wingate, County Durham and played for NER Durham before joining Hartlepool United in 1920.

Yews joined West Ham United for a fee of £150 in 1923 and played in the high-scoring Hammers team that included Vic Watson, and Jimmy Ruffell on the opposite wing. He made a total of 361 appearances for the Upton Park club, scoring 51 goals.

He left West Ham in 1933 and played three League games for Clapton Orient before retiring.

References

External links
Tommy Yews at westhamstats.info
Tommy Yews at Spartacus Educational

1902 births
1966 deaths
People from Wingate, County Durham
Footballers from County Durham
English footballers
Association football wingers
Hartlepool United F.C. players
West Ham United F.C. players
Leyton Orient F.C. players
English Football League players